¿Por qué nací mujer? ("Why Was I Born a Woman?") is a 1970 Mexican film. It stars Sara García.

Cast

External links
 

1970 films
Mexican drama films
1970s Spanish-language films
Films directed by Rogelio A. González
1970s Mexican films